Acarapis woodi is an internal parasite affecting honey bees, the symptoms of infestation was originally observed on the Isle of Wight in 1904, but was not described until 1921. Acarapis woodi mites  live and reproduce in the tracheae of the bees. The symptoms of Acarapis woodi infestation were originally called by beekeepers as the Isle of Wight Disease, however it is now called Acarine, after the Subclass to which the mites belong. All mites are arachnids like spiders. The female mite attaches 5–7 eggs to the tracheal walls, where the larvae hatch and develop in 11–15 days to adult mites. The mites parasitize young bees up to two weeks old through the tracheal tube openings. There, they pierce the tracheal tube walls with their mouthparts and feed on the haemolymph of the bees. More than a hundred mites can populate the tracheae and weaken the bees. Mercedes Delfinado identified Acarapsis woodi's presence in the USA.

Other mites similar in appearance include Acarapis externus and Acarapis dorsalis.

References

Trombidiformes
Agricultural pest mites
Western honey bee pests
Animals described in 1921
Parasites of bees
Fauna of the United Kingdom